The 2022–23 season is the 128th season in the existence of Manchester City Football Club and their 21st consecutive season in the top flight of English football, where they are competing as two-time defending champions. In addition to the Premier League, Manchester City are also participating in this season's editions of the FA Cup, EFL Cup, Community Shield and UEFA Champions League, entering the latter for the 12th consecutive season. The season is unusual in that the fixture dates of domestic and European competitions were altered to accommodate the 2022 FIFA World Cup played in November and December 2022 in Qatar.

Manchester City kicked off the season by losing the Community Shield to Liverpool 1–3, and were knocked out of the EFL Cup by Southampton at the quarter-final stages in January 2023. As of the end of 2022, City sat second in the Premier League, seven points behind Arsenal, and had advanced to the Champions League round of 16.

One of this season's highlights are the goalscoring feats of City's new striker Erling Haaland in his debut season in English football. He has already broken several club, league and European records after scoring 33 goals in his first thirty three games at City.

This is the first season since 2012–13 without former team captain Fernandinho, who left at the end of the previous season to return to Brazil, and the first since 2014–15 not to feature English forward Raheem Sterling, who moved to Chelsea in the summer.

Kits
Supplier: Puma / Sponsor: Etihad Airways

Season summary

Pre-season
Manchester City had already resolved their most pressing squad issue before the end of the previous season: when they announced their agreement to recruit a world-class centre-forward in Erling Haaland from Borussia Dortmund. This transfer was confirmed on the 13 June with Haaland formally joining the first team on 1 July. Julián Álvarez would also join from River Plate, having been transferred in January 2022 and then temporarily loaned back.

City were expected to purchase a defensive midfielder to replace former captain Fernandinho. Kalvin Phillips was duly signed from Leeds United for a reported fee of £42 million plus add-ons on 4 July 2022 and took the number 4 shirt previously worn by Vincent Kompany. They were also reported to be in the market for a new specialist left-back, with rumours that Marc Cucurella at Brighton was their number one target.

City's first player sales of the season were the transfer out of Pedro Porro to Sporting Lisbon through a loan-to-buy deal for £7.2 million. and of Gavin Bazunu to Southampton for £12 million initially, up to £15 million after add-ons. Neither player had made a first-team appearance for City.

City began pre-season with several key first-team players entering the final years of their contract amidst rumours that they might leave the club for a fee rather than renew. Of these, it seemed the most speculation concerned Gabriel Jesus and his possible transfer to Arsenal, Tottenham or Real Madrid after 5 years at City; and Raheem Sterling who was also rumoured to be a Real Madrid target. Both players would, in theory, compete with the incoming Haaland and Alvarez for playing time if they remained. Jesus left City for Arsenal for a reported fee of £45 million on 4 July 2022. Sterling went on to join Chelsea on 13 July 2022 for a fee reported to be about £47.5 million with £2.5 million of add-ons. He had won 11 domestic titles in 7 seasons at the club, scoring 131 goals in 339 appearances, and was the club's 11th highest scorer of all time.

Another significant transfer was the move of versatile Ukrainian left-back / midfielder Oleksandr Zinchenko to Arsenal for a fee of around £30 million after 6 seasons at City on 22 July 2022. This left Pep Guardiola with just two senior specialist full-backs in his squad at the start of the new season, both of whom were natural right-backs, meaning City did not have a first team left-back. Manchester City had refused to offer the minimum £50 million fee demanded by Brighton for Cucurella and he was eventually transferred to Chelsea on 5 August for a reported fee in excess of £60 million.

City opted to start pre-season training a week later than most of their rivals and scheduled only two friendly warm up games as part of their tour of the United States in order to ensure their players would have sufficient rest. They would also begin the new season with a relatively small squad of just 20 senior players. Both of these were considered to be strong preferences by Guardiola.

Start of season
City won both their pre-season tour games in the U.S. However, they tasted their first defeat of the season in the first match, losing 1–3 to a more prepared Liverpool side in the Community Shield held at Leicester City's King Power Stadium. Debutant Julián Álvarez scored the sole goal for the Blues. For their part, Liverpool were visibly more in-form, as they had a longer pre-season.

In their first league game on 7 August, City beat West Ham 2–0 away, with Erling Haaland scoring his first two competitive goals on his league debut for the club. He became the first City player to do so since Sergio Agüero versus Swansea City in 2011. The following weekend, City announced that İlkay Gündoğan had been appointed club captain with Rodri and Kyle Walker joining the vice-captain leadership group, shortly after City won their first league game at home 4–0 against AFC Bournemouth.

City finally recruited a specialist left-back on 16 August, signing Spanish U-21 defender Sergio Gómez for £11 million plus add-ons from Anderlecht, where he had previously played under the management of former City defender and captain Vincent Kompany.

On 21 August, City played Newcastle United in an entertaining match at St James' Park and fought out another two-goal comeback to snatch a 3–3 draw. With seven points after three games, City were second in the league standings, two points behind Arsenal.

On 27 August, City fell behind by two goals for the fourth time in six league matches, this time against Crystal Palace at home; only to recover to a 4–2 victory in a second half comeback, with Erling Haaland scoring his first home goals and first hat-trick for the club.

On 31 August, Haaland became the first City player in the Premier League era to score a hat-trick in consecutive league games, scoring a "perfect" one in a 6–0 home rout of newly promoted Nottingham Forest. He had scored 9 goals in his first five league games, another Premier League record.

City were estimated to have earnt a Premier League record of about £180 million from transfer sales during the single summer 2022 window, thus demonstrating the success of the team's academy programme (sales included several youth players sold for seven- or eight-figure fees), and the increasing market value for footballers (such as Zinchenko and Jesus) gained from playing under Guardiola and his coaching team for several seasons. City's overall net-spend in both 2022 transfer windows was estimated to be around +£100m, once again challenging their reputation for being a ostentatious buying club since the 2008 take-over.

In their opening UEFA Champions League group game, Manchester City thrashed Sevilla 4–0 in Spain, with a Haaland brace, which brought his tally up to 12 goals in 8 games for City and 25 goals in just 20 Champions League appearances. This was Sevilla's largest ever defeat at home in the Champions League and their first defeat in an opening fixture since their debut season; this was also the sixth time in seven seasons that City have won their opening fixture in the competition.

City's home league fixture against Tottenham Hotspur, which originally was due to be played on 10 September, was postponed a day beforehand along with the entire weekend's English football league programme as a mark of respect following the death of Queen Elizabeth II. The following week, the away league fixture against Arsenal, due to be played on 19 October, was also postponed indirectly due to events following the Queen's death.

As of late September, and the first international break of the season, City were second in the league, one point behind Arsenal and ahead of Spurs on goal difference, after five wins and two draws. By that point, Haaland had already scored 14 goals in 10 games in all competitions and become the first player in Premier League history to score in all his first four away fixtures. City had also extended their unbeaten away run in the league to 22 games and well over a year since their last defeat.

Autumn period
On 2 October, City beat Manchester United 6–3 in the first Manchester derby of the season at the Etihad, making it the highest scoring derby match of all-time. Both Haaland and Phil Foden scored the first City derby hat-tricks in 52 years and only the third and fourth of all-time. Haaland also became the first Premier League player to score a hat-trick in three consecutive home games, and City became the first team since Tottenham in 1965 to win 8 consecutive league home games while scoring three goals or more. With his performance, the Norwegian pushed his output to an incredible 17 goals in 11 appearances, as well as 14 Premier League goals in 8 appearances.

A 4–0 home league victory against Southampton the following week included another goal from Haaland and meant he had now scored in ten consecutive fixtures overall and seven in the Premier League. The latter record matched a feat accomplished only once before by a City player in the Premier League, namely Sergio Agüero in 2019. Haaland had also reached the milestone of 20 goals for the season after playing only thirteen matches, another league record. Moreover, City matched the previous all-time English record set by Wolves in 1959 of nine consecutive home league wins while scoring three or more goals. In the league standings, the Blues maintained their second place with 23 points, just one behind surprise leaders Arsenal and already three ahead of third-placed Spurs.

City qualified for the last 16 of the Champions League for the tenth consecutive season on 11 October. Although they could only draw 0–0 away to Copenhagen that night, a 1–1 draw between Dortmund and Sevilla ensured their progression. City's match included three first-half VAR decisions: a spectacular 25-yard Rodri strike ruled out because of an unintentional Riyad Mahrez handball in the build-up, a penalty awarded to City, also for handball, taken by Mahrez and saved, and a red-card shown to City's left back Sergio Gómez for a professional foul which left the Blues playing with 10 men for over an hour.

City suffered their first league defeat in a hard fought match against Liverpool at Anfield on 16 October. Mo Salah scored the winning breakaway goal after Phil Foden had seen his effort ruled out by VAR for a foul on Fabinho by Haaland in the build up.

A second consecutive 0–0 Champions League away draw, to Dortmund on 25 October was sufficient to ensure City would qualify for the last 16 as group winners with one game to spare. On 2 November, Rico Lewis scored his first senior goal in a 3–1 win against Sevilla; he became the all-time youngest scorer on a first start in a Champions League match and City's youngest ever Champions League scorer, aged 17 years and 346 days. Three days later, City beat Fulham 2–1 in the league at the Etihad, having played for over an hour with ten men after João Cancelo had been sent-off when adjudged to have deliberately denied Harry Wilson a goal-scoring opportunity with a shoulder charge. City's winner was scored in the fifth minute of injury time by Haaland, netting a penalty after De Bruyne had been fouled. This led to ecstatic scenes afterwards with Guardiola encouraging his players to thank the crowd with a lap of honour.

The Blues lost their final game before the mid-season break for the World Cup on 12 November, having been deservingly beaten 1–2 at home to Brentford with a brace, and 98th minute winner, from Ivan Toney, who had just learnt a couple of days beforehand he was not being called up to the England squad to play in Qatar. City therefore ended the first part of the season in second place in the league, five points behind Arsenal and two points ahead of Newcastle, but with a game in hand; the Blues also safely qualified for the last 16 of the Champions League and reached the fourth round of the EFL Cup.

Sixteen of City's players were called up in squads to play in the World Cup finals, second only to Barcelona (17) in world football, and the most in the club's history. This left just eight players remaining at home until the season resumed the week before Christmas with a home EFL Cup tie against Liverpool. Only two of City's World Cup participants played for teams eliminated at the group stage of the competition. The other fourteen would remain for the knockout stages. However, only Julián Álvarez reached the final week of the competition in the Argentina squad, while the others were eliminated either in the round of 16 or quarter-finals. Álvarez went on to become the fifth player to participate on the pitch in a World Cup final while playing at City (after Nigel de Jong in 2010, and Sergio Agüero, Pablo Zabaleta and Martin Demichelis in 2014), and only the second to become a World Cup winner as a City player.

The club announced on 23 November that Pep Guardiola had signed a new contract to remain as manager for an additional two years until summer 2025.

Christmas and New Year
All but two of City's first team players had been able to return to training by the time of the first competitive fixture after the resumption of the season. Ederson had been delayed by flight problems returning from Brazil, and Álvarez was permitted an extended break to enjoy the victory celebrations in Argentina. In their first match back on 22 December, City beat Liverpool for the first time in two seasons with an entertaining 3–2 win in the fourth round of the EFL Cup, thus knocking out the current holders and qualifying for the quarter-finals.

Another brace from Haaland in City's 3–1 away victory over Leeds in their first league game after the World Cup moved him to 20 league goals for the season, as he became the fastest player since the formation of the Premier League to reach this milestone (after only 14 appearances).

City suffered from inconsistent form in early January 2023. They were convincingly knocked out of the EFL Cup by Southampton in a 2–0 defeat at St. Mary's and dropped league points against Everton and Manchester United to allow Arsenal to open up an eight point gap at the top of the league. The latter derby defeat included a controversial equalising goal for their rivals which should have been ruled out for off-side. However, the blues also convincingly beat Chelsea 4–0 in the FA Cup to reach the fourth round.

Haaland scored his fourth hat-trick of the season in City's 3–0 victory over Wolves on 22 January. This set a new club record for the most hat-tricks scored in a single season and a new national record for the fewest games to achieve the milestone. It also moved Haaland to 31 goals in all competitions for the season, only seven behind City's all-time record as he became only the 13th player in the club's history to score more than thirty.

Joao Cancelo was moved on loan to Bayern Munich on winter transfer deadline day for the remainder of the season with an option for a later permanent transfer amid rumours he had fallen out with coach Guardiola. Until then Cancelo had played the most minutes of football of any of the squad's defenders but had found game time more limited since the World Cup with the emergence of teenage academy graduate Rico Lewis and the form of Nathan Ake.

On 6 February, the Premier League announced that after a four year investigation, they were charging Manchester City F.C. with committing more than 100 breaches of financial rules, referring the club to an independent commission for breaches made between 2009 and 2018. Manchester City were also accused of not co-operating with the investigation. The punishments that the commission can impose range from fines to points deduction and/or expulsion from the Premier League.

Despite this, City went back to the top of league on 15 February when they beat the previous leaders, Arsenal, 3–1 at the Emirates to lead on goal difference, although their opponents that day still had a game in hand. However, this lead was brief as City's inconsistency and wasteful finishing again cost them two points in the following game away at Nottingham Forest as they were held 1–1 with a late equaliser by Chris Wood for their hosts; while Arsenal won their game in hand to stretch their lead again to five points by early March.

Haaland scored his 27th goal of the league season against Bournemouth on 25 February to set a new club Premier League record for most goals scored in a season, beating the previous record by Sergio Agüero set in 2014-15.

On 28 February, City defeated Bristol City on the road 3–0, advancing to the FA Cup quarter-finals.

Season run in 
On 14 March, on a record breaking night, City defeated RB Leipzig 7–0 at home in their Champions League round of 16 2nd leg tie to advance to the quarter-finals of the competition 8–1 on aggregate. This equalled City's record score-line in the competition, but the match was particularly notable for the five goals scored by Erling Haaland who in doing so scored his 39th goal of the season and broke the 94 year old club record of Tommy Johnson. It was also the first time a City player had scored five goals in a single continental match and broke the record for the most number of continental goals scored in a season.

First-team squad
 
 As of 31 January 2023

Transfers

Transfers in

Transfers out

Loans out

New contracts

Pre-season and friendlies
On 25 April, City announced they would travel to the United States for two pre-season friendlies in preparation for the new season, starting with a fixture against Club América on 20 July. The second fixture against Bayern Munich on 23 July was announced a few days later. City announced they would play a friendly game against fellow CFG team Girona on 17 December at their Academy Stadium as a warm up to the resumption of the post-World Cup season.

Competitions

Overall record

Premier League

League table

Results summary

Result by match day

Matches
The league fixtures were announced on 16 June 2022.

FA Cup

City entered the competition in the third round and were drawn at home to Chelsea, making it a rematch of the third round League Cup tie earlier that season. The fourth round draw was held shortly before City's third round tie against Chelsea, with the Blues drawn against the winner of the following day's Oxford United vs Arsenal tie. In the fifth round, City were drawn away to Bristol City. After their victory, the Cityzens were drawn at home to Burnley in the quarter-finals.

EFL Cup

City entered the competition in the third round. The draw was held on 24 August 2022 after the second round fixtures were completed, and they were drawn at home to the previous season's runners-up Chelsea as one of seven all-Premier League ties. The draw for the fourth round was held after the final match of the third round between Manchester United and Aston Villa on 10 November by Peter Schmeichel and Dion Dublin. City were drawn at home to the current cup holders Liverpool. The tie would be held immediately after the World Cup final,  before the resumption of league fixtures. City were handed an away tie at Southampton in the quarter-finals draw held immediately after their fourth-round victory over Liverpool.

FA Community Shield

The traditional season curtain raiser was played between Manchester City and Liverpool, the previous season's league champions and FA Cup winners respectively. Normally held at Wembley Stadium, this season's edition was played at Leicester City's King Power Stadium to avoid clashes with UEFA Women's Euro 2022.

UEFA Champions League

Group stage

The 2022–23 UEFA Champions League group stage draw took place in Istanbul, Turkey, on 25 August. The first group matches were played on 6 September 2022, and they wrapped up earlier than usual, at the start of November, to accommodate the mid-season 2022 FIFA World Cup.

Knockout phase

Round of 16
The draw for the round of 16 was held on 7 November 2022 at UEFA's headquarters in Nyon, with Manchester City being drawn against RB Leipzig.

Quarter-finals
The draw for the quarter-finals and semi-finals was held on 17 March 2023. City were drawn against Bayern Munich in the quarter-finals, with the winner of that tie playing either Real Madrid or Chelsea in the semi-finals.

Statistics

Overall
Appearances numbers are for appearances in competitive games only, including sub appearances.
Red card numbers denote: numbers in parentheses represent red cards overturned for wrongful dismissal.Source for all stats:

Goalscorers
Includes all competitive matches. The list is sorted alphabetically by surname when total goals are equal.

Assists
Includes all competitive matches. The list is sorted alphabetically by surname when total assists are equal.

Disciplinary record
Includes all competitive matches. The list is sorted alphabetically by surname when total cards are equal.

Hat-tricks

4 - Player scored four goals
5 - Player scored five goals

Clean sheets
The list is sorted by shirt number when total clean sheets are equal. Numbers in parentheses represent games where both goalkeepers participated and both kept a clean sheet; the number in parentheses is awarded to the goalkeeper who was substituted on, whilst a full clean sheet is awarded to the goalkeeper who was on the field at the start of play.

Awards

Premier League Player of the Month
Awarded by a combination of an online public vote on the EA SPORTS website with those of a panel of football experts.

Etihad Player of the Month
Awarded by an online vote of supporters on the official Manchester City F.C. website.

Notes

See also
 2022–23 in English football
 List of Manchester City F.C. seasons

References

2022–23
Manchester City
Manchester City
Manchester City